The MFL Challenge Cup (Malay: Piala Cabaran MFL), formerly known as Malaysia Challenge Cup, is a Malaysian football competition held under the auspices of the Malaysian Football League and the Football Association of Malaysia.

The tournament was created for Malaysia Super League and Malaysia Premier League teams that did not qualify for the Malaysia Cup tournament through their league standings at the end of the league season. The idea was mooted by Football Malaysia in December 2017 as a solution to inactivity for the teams that did not qualify for the more prestigious Malaysia Cup. Observers such as FourFourTwo Malaysia see benefits of the Challenge Cup; as another chance of silverware for the competitors, maintaining the competitive edge between the participating teams, and as a way to analyze players in their teams in preparation for the next season.

The inaugural tournament was held in 2018, with 8 teams divided into 2 groups of four teams and playing a double round-robin system of games. The winners and runners-up of each group qualify to the knockout round, each rounds is held on a home and away basis including the final. The tournament is held concurrently with the Malaysia Cup, with Challenge Cup games played in midweek (Tuesday, Wednesday) as opposed to Malaysia Cup games played on weekends (Friday, Saturday and Sunday).

Future tournament winners may receive a slot in the Malaysia Cup, based on the success of the Challenge Cup, and the restructuring of Malaysia Cup qualification.

Selection of teams
For the 2018 edition, the team that finished last in the Malaysia Super League, and the sixth-placed to twelfth-placed teams in the Malaysia Premier League qualified for the tournament, but due to Kuantan FA being ejected in the middle of the league season (and subsequently disbanded), the FAM invited ATM FA, the highest positioned team in the 2018 Malaysia FAM Cup that did not qualify for the FAM Cup knock-out stage to take part in the tournament. 

The selection of teams remains the same for the 2019 edition: one team from the 2019 Malaysia Super League (12th placed team), and seven teams from the 2019 Malaysia Premier League (6th to 12th placed teams). Once again, a team from Premier League was not eligible, this time Perlis which were thrown out of the 2019 Malaysia Premier League in February 2019. Unlike the 2018 edition there are no teams will be invited into the Challenge Cup to replace them, meaning only 7 teams left in the competition.

The 2020 and the 2021 edition was not held due to COVID-19 pandemic and subsequent restrictions placed by the Malaysian government to combat it. After also not held in 2022, FAM announced the competition will return in 2023, featuring 8 teams who are eliminated in the last 16 of the 2023 Malaysia Cup.

Results

Successful teams

Awards

Top scorers

See also
 Malaysia Cup

References

External links
Football Malaysia 

Recurring sporting events established in 2018